The 2014 United States House of Representatives election in West Virginia was held on November 4, 2014, to elect the three U.S. representatives from West Virginia, one from each of the state's three congressional districts.

Republicans won control of every congressional district in West Virginia for the first time since the 61st Congress ended in 1911.

Representatives are elected for two-year terms. Those elected served in the 114th Congress from January 2015 until January 2017.

Overview

By district
Results of the 2014 United States House of Representatives elections in West Virginia by district:

District 1
Republican David McKinley, who had represented West Virginia's 1st congressional district since 2011, was re-elected in 2012. While McKinley had expressed some interest in running for Senate, he later declared he would not run. He filed for re-election to his House seat on January 15, 2014.

Glen Gainer III, the West Virginia State Auditor, sought the Democratic nomination unopposed.

Republican primary

Democratic primary

General election

Polling

Results

District 2
Republican Shelley Moore Capito, who had represented West Virginia's 2nd congressional district since 2001, won her seventh term in Congress with almost 70 percent of the vote in 2012. She announced that she would not run for re-election, so that she could run for the United States Senate seat held by retiring Democrat Jay Rockefeller.

Republican primary

Candidates
Declared
 Robert Fluharty, veteran, investigator and Eastern Panhandle resident
 Steve Harrison, state senator
 Charlotte Lane, former state delegate, former United States International Trade Commissioner and nominee for West Virginia Attorney General in 1996
 Alex Mooney, former chairman of the Maryland Republican Party and former Maryland State Senator
 Jim Moss, Putnam County resident
 Ken Reed, pharmacy owner from Berkeley Springs
 Ron Walters, Jr., son of State Delegate Ron Walters

Declined
 Tim Armstead, Minority Leader of the West Virginia House of Delegates
 Shelley Moore Capito, incumbent U.S. Representative (running for the U.S. Senate)
 Larry Faircloth, former state delegate (running for the state senate)
 Betty Ireland, former Secretary of State of West Virginia
 Patrick Lane, state delegate
 Bill Maloney, businessman and nominee for governor in 2011 and 2012
 Patrick Morrisey, Attorney General of West Virginia
 Eric Nelson, state delegate
 Suzette Raines, state delegate (running for the state senate)
 Charles Trump, attorney

Results

Democratic primary

Candidates
Declared
 Nick Casey, former chairman of the West Virginia Democratic Party
 Meshea Poore, state delegate

Declined
 Matt Dunn, attorney
 Steven Gower, Weston resident
 Doug Skaff, state delegate
 Herb Snyder, state senator
 Rod Snyder, president of the Young Democrats of America
 Erik Wells, state senator

Results

General election

Polling

Results

District 3
Rahall was considered one of the most "endangered" House Democrats by the House Democratic campaign committee.  Rahall was endorsed by the National Rifle Association's Political Victory Fund.

The National Right to Life Committee, West Virginia Chamber of Commerce, and West Virginians for Life, all of which had previously supported Rahall, supported Jenkins in 2014, and the West Virginia Coal Association endorsed Jenkins in September 2014.  Jenkins supported the repeal of Obamacare and pledged to replace it.

As of September 18, 2014, the race was rated a "toss up" by both University of Virginia political professor Larry Sabato, of Sabato's Crystal Ball, and Stu Rothenberg of the Rothenberg Political Report.  As of October 2, managing editor Kyle Kondik of Sabato's Crystal Ball said the race was still a toss-up, calling it "Super close, super expensive and super nasty."

A Fox News op-ed opined in October that Jenkins "offers Republicans the most credible nominee the party has had since the mid-'90s. In a race that will see as much advertising by third-party organizations as any House race in the country, the winner will be the candidate who voters believe will do the most to take on President Obama's War on Coal and the EPA."

Through October 6, 2014, 16,340 ads had appeared on broadcast television, the second-highest number of ads of any district in the U.S.  By mid-October 2014, it was anticipated that $12.8 million could be spent on ads in the race by Election Day.  Rahall outspent Jenkins in the election by a two-to-one ratio.

Time listed a Rahall ad in its article: "Here Are 5 of The Most Dishonest Political Ads of 2014," and The Washington Post ran an article regarding the same Rahall ad entitled: "A sleazy attack puts words in the other candidate's mouth".

Jenkins won the election, defeating incumbent Rahall in November 2014 with 55.3% of the vote to Rahall's 44.7%.

Democratic primary
In 2014, Democrat Nick Rahall, who had represented West Virginia in Congress since 1977, ran for re-election to the 3rd District seat, after having considered running for the Senate but instead deciding to run for re-election. Veteran Richard Ojeda ran against Rahall for the Democratic nomination, but lost.

Results

Republican primary
For the Republicans, State Senator Evan Jenkins, who switched parties in July 2013, ran for the seat against Rahall.
Jenkins ran unopposed in the Republican primary.  State Senator Bill Cole, who had considered a run for the seat himself, was Jenkins' campaign chairman. Snuffer considered running again, but did not file.

In July 2013, Jenkins switched to the Republican Party in preparation for his run at the seat.
On switching parties, Jenkins stated that: "West Virginia is under attack from Barack Obama and a Democratic Party that our parents and grandparents would not recognize." In 2012, West Virginia's 3rd district went for Mitt Romney 66-32 percent.

Results

General election

Polling

Results

See also
 2014 United States House of Representatives elections
 2014 United States elections

References

External links
U.S. House elections in West Virginia, 2014 at Ballotpedia
Campaign contributions at OpenSecrets

West Virginia
2014
United States House of Representatives